The prehnite-pumpellyite facies is a metamorphic facies typical of subseafloor alteration of the oceanic crust around mid-ocean ridge spreading centres. 

It is a metamorphic grade transitional between zeolite facies and greenschist facies representing a temperature range of 250 to 350 °C and a pressure range of approximately two to seven kilobars. The mineral assemblage is dependent on host composition. 
In mafic rocks the assemblage is chlorite, prehnite, albite, pumpellyite and epidote. 
In ultramafic rocks the assemblage is serpentine, talc, forsterite, tremolite and chlorite.
In argillaceous sedimentary rocks the assemblage is quartz, illite, albite, and stilpnomelane chlorite. 
In carbonate sediments the assemblage is calcite, dolomite, quartz, clays, talc, and muscovite.

References
 Blatt, Harvey and Robert Tracy, 1995, Petrology: igneous, sedimentary, and metamorphic, Freeman, 

Metamorphic petrology